Maurizio 'Mo' Gherardini (born September 22, 1955) is an Italian sportsman, currently serving as a general manager of Fenerbahçe. In 2017, he was named the EuroLeague Executive of the Year in a year in which his club Fenerbahçe won the EuroLeague championship.

Basketball career
Gherardini started his basketball career as a player playing on his hometown team of Libertas Pallacanestro Forlì from 1971 to 1975. From there he went on to become an assistant coach for Forlì and was also a director of youth teams for the club. He held those roles from 1975–1982, when he was then promoted to be the team's general manager in 1983. Forlì was playing in the top league (LBA) when Gherardini took over as GM.

After nine years at the helm of Forlì, Gherardini left the team in 1992 to take over as the general manager of Benetton Treviso, and molded that squad into one of the most familiar basketball clubs outside of the NBA.  Benetton won four Italian League championships (1997, 2002, 2003, and 2006), three Italian Supercups (1997-98 season, 2001-02 season, and 2002-03 season), made four appearances in the EuroLeague Final Four (1993, 1998, 2002, and 2003), and helped them capture seven Italian Cups (1993–1995, 2000, 2003–2005). He was named the Italian League's Best Executive in 2006.

Gherardini also developed a sophisticated scouting system in the EuroLeague. NBA teams asked for his advice when it came to selecting players out of Europe.

Former NBA basketball player and general manager Kiki Vandeweghe said that Gherardini was one of the best general managers in the world and said that there is no doubt that Gherardini would make a great GM in the NBA.

Interviewed by Charlotte
In 2003, Gherardini was interviewed for the Charlotte Bobcats general manager position. It was the first time that a non-American citizen had been interviewed for a top job on an NBA team. Although he was seriously considered for the job, the Bobcats hired Bernie Bickerstaff instead.

Hired by Toronto
On June 22, 2006, Gherardini was hired by the Toronto Raptors as vice president and assistant general manager.

Oklahoma City
Following Bryan Colangelo's departure from Toronto, Gherardini was made free to pursue other options. He was hired Nov. 7, 2013, by the Oklahoma City Thunder as their senior advisor of international affairs.

Fenerbahçe and Turkey
Gherardini became new General manager of Turkish club Fenerbahçe, on May 21, 2014.

Canada Basketball
Gherardini is also a member of Canada Basketball's Council Of Excellence.

References

External links
 Official blog

1955 births
Living people
Fenerbahçe basketball coaches
Italian men's basketball coaches
Italian men's basketball players
People from Forlì
Toronto Raptors executives
Sportspeople from the Province of Forlì-Cesena